Thomas Reynell (13 September 1625 – 1698) of East Ogwell, Devon, was an English lawyer and politician who sat in the House of Commons at various times between 1654 and 1689.

Reynell was the eldest son of Sir Richard Reynell of East Ogwell, Devon and his wife (and cousin)  Mary Reynell, daughter of Richard Reynell of Creedy Widger, near Crediton.   He was the elder brother of Sir Richard Reynell, 1st Baronet, Lord Chief Justice of Ireland. He was educated at Exeter College, Oxford in 1640 and entered Middle Temple in 1641. In 1647 he was J.P. He succeeded to the family estates on the death of his father in 1648. In 1649 he was called to the bar.

Reynell was JP for Devon again and was commissioner for assessment for Devon in 1652. He was JP for Devon again in 1653 and remained in post until 1660. In 1654, he was elected Member of Parliament for Devon for the First Protectorate Parliament. He was re-elected MP for Devon in 1656 for the Second Protectorate Parliament. He was commissioner for assessment in 1657 and commissioner for militia in 1659. In 1659 he was elected MP for Ashburton in the Third Protectorate Parliament.

Reynell was commissioner for assessment from January 1660 to 1663 and commissioner for militia in March 1660. He did not stand for parliament after the Restoration when he was described as "an arrant Presbyterian and a very dangerous Commonwealthman". He became JP for Devon again in August 1660 until 1676. In 1667 he was commissioner for inquiry into the Newfoundland government. He was commissioner for assessment from 1673 to 1680 and commissioner for recusants for Devon in 1675. From 1677 to 1678 he was High Sheriff of Devon. He was elected MP for Ashburton again for the two parliaments of 1679 and 1681. In May 1685, he was taken into custody prior to the Duke of Monmouth's invasion. He was JP for Devon again from 1687 until his death. In March 1688 he was commissioner for inquiry into recusancy fines for Devon, Dorset and Cornwall and from May to October 1688 he was Deputy Lieutenant. He was alderman for Totnes from April to October 1688. In 1689 he was elected MP for Ashburton again. In 1690 he stepped aside to allow his brother Richard, who had been temporarily removed from his position on the Irish Bench, to hold the seat. He was commissioner for assessment from 1689 to 1690.  
 
Reynell died at the age of 73 and was buried at East Ogwell on 1 March 1698.

Reynell married firstly Mary Bennet, daughter of John Bennet of London and had a son and four daughters. He married secondly by licence dated  25 July 1673, Elizabeth Gould, widow of William Vincent, merchant of Exeter, and daughter of James Gould, merchant of London. They had three sons and two daughters. He was succeeded by Richard his eldest son by the second marriage, who was MP for Ashburton between 1702 and 1734.

References

1625 births
1698 deaths
Members of the Middle Temple
Alumni of Exeter College, Oxford
High Sheriffs of Devon
Members of the Parliament of England for Ashburton
English MPs 1654–1655
English MPs 1656–1658
English MPs 1659
English MPs 1689–1690
Thomas
Members of the Parliament of England (pre-1707) for Devon